Rogalands Avis is a local newspaper published in Stavanger, Norway.

History and profile

Rogalands Avis was established in 1899. The paper is based in Stavanger and covers the southern Rogaland.

A Labour Party-affiliated newspaper, it was titled 1ste Mai until 1955, when it absorbed the bankrupt Haugaland Arbeiderblad. Notable former editors-in-chief include Johan Gjøstein, Cornelius Holmboe (1908–1909), Otto Luihn, Hans Andreas Hanssen (1919–1920), Børge Olsen-Hagen (1920–1936), Trond Hegna (1940–1958), Engwall Pahr-Iversen (1978-1990), Norulv Øvrebotten (1990-1996) and Lars Helle (1996-2000). Rogalands Avis is owned 95.8% by A-pressen Lokale Medier AS, which in turn is owned 100% by A-pressen.

Rogalands Avis had a circulation of 13,276 copies in 2006 and there were 10,521 subscribers the same year. In 2009 its circulation was 10,500 copies. The circulation of the paper was 8,471 copies in 2012.

References

Norwegian Media Registry

External links
Website

1899 establishments in Norway
Newspapers established in 1899
Daily newspapers published in Norway
Norwegian-language newspapers
Amedia
Mass media in Stavanger